Noalmark Broadcasting Corporation is a radio and media company based in El Dorado, Arkansas. Founded by William C. Nolan Jr., Edwin B. Alderson Jr. and El Dorado car dealer Russell Marks (all deceased) in 1970, it owns radio stations in Arkansas and New Mexico.

Background

Arkansas
KIXB, KMRX, KAGL, KELD (AM), KELD-FM, KLBQ (FM), KDMS, and KMLK, which are all operated out of their studios in El Dorado, Arkansas. 870-863-6126

Prior to June 1, 2016, Noalmark Broadcasting owned KBHS, KYRC, KHRK, and KLAZ in the Hot Springs, Arkansas, market.

KVMA and KVMZ, which are all operated out of their studios in Magnolia, Arkansas.  These properties are managed by Patrick Nolan from the El Dorado Studios.

In May 2007, Noalmark Broadcasting entered into an agreement to purchase Clark County Broadcasting in Arkadelphia.  This group of stations includes KYXK, KDEL, and KVRC

Prior to the purchase of these stations, Noalmark received a construction permit in the FCC Auction 70 to build a new Class A FM radio station on the 93.5 MHz frequency.  This became 93.5 Bismarck in the Hot Springs, Arkansas market.

In that same auction, Noalmark received a construction permit to build another Class A FM radio station on the 92.7 MHz frequency KIXC in Bearden, Arkansas. This radio station will serve the Camden, Hampton, and Fordyce communities.

New Mexico
KIXN, KZOR, KEJL, KLEA-FM, KPZA-FM, are all operated in Hobbs, New Mexico, studios.

In January 2008, Noalmark took control of heritage stations KBIM and KBIM-FM in Roswell, New Mexico. KBIM and KBIM-FM operate on 910 AM and 94.9 FM.

Noalmark stations

AM stations

FM stations

References

Companies based in Arkansas
Noalmark Broadcasting Corporation radio stations
Radio broadcasting companies of the United States
El Dorado, Arkansas
Mass media in Arkansas
Companies established in 1970
1970 establishments in Arkansas